The Well-Known And Some Other Favourite Stories is a Jill Johnson box set, released 27 October 2010, consisting of three CDs. The first CD includes some new-written songs, including a vocal duet with Chip Taylor, while the second includes some other "favourites" and the third a live CD from the 2008 Baby Blue Paper tour in Sweden

Track listing

The Well-Known
No Surrender
Why'd You Come in Here Lookin' Like That
Stumble and Fade Away (new)
Angel of the Morning
Say Something
Jolene
Can't Get Enough of You
Hopelessly Devoted
Someone to flatter (new)
Cowboy Up
Forever's Going Underground (new)
It's a Heartache
Desperado
Song to Heaven
The Heat is On
Mother's Jewel
Crazy in Love
Top of the World
Lost Without Yor Love
Oh, vilken härlig da'
Kärleken är

Some Other Favourite Stories
Roots & Wings
Love Ain't Nothin'
Don't Feel Like Me
Love Lessons
When Love Doesn't Love You
Nathalie
Too Late to be Drinkin'
Breakfast in New York
Something I Can't Do
Better than Me
What Happened to us
A Woman Knows
Baby Blue Paper
When Being Who You Are
You're Still Here
Just Where the Rainbow Ends
Just Like You Do
Little Girl of Mine
It is too Late

Baby Blue Paper (live)
Baby Blue Paper
Where the Rainbow Ends
You're Looking for Me
Roots & Wings
I Should Have Left Sooner
You Think You're the Man
Say Something
Don't Feel Like Me
What Happened to us
When Being Who You Are
A Woman Knows
You Better Think Again
Angel of the Morning
Love Lessons
Better than Me
Papa Come Quick
Jolene

Charts

References

2010 compilation albums
2010 live albums
Jill Johnson albums
Compilation albums by Swedish artists
Live albums by Swedish artists